Castel San Giovanni is a town and comune in the province of Piacenza, Emilia-Romagna, Italy.

History 
The origins of the town are probably related to an ancient pieve called Olubra and a fortress called Castellus Milonus, which preceded the construction of a new castle by Alberto Scoto in 1290 (now also disappeared).

After a period under the Dal Verme family of lords-condottieri, it became part of the Duchy of Parma and Piacenza in 1485.

Main sights 
 The Collegiata (14th century), with Baroque portals and a 1496 crucifix by Giacomo del Maino and his son Giovanni Angelo.
 Church of San Giovanni Battista (12th century)
 Villa Braghieri-Albesani (18th century), with several frescoed rooms.

Famous people
 Agostino Casaroli, Catholic cardinal
 Pippo Santonastaso, Italian actor

International relations

Twin towns — Sister cities

Castel San Giovanni is twinned with:
  Slunj, Croatia
  Dunellen, New Jersey, United States

References

Cities and towns in Emilia-Romagna